Jasper Wilson Johns (1824 – 26 July 1891) was a civil engineer, merchant, railway promoter and  Liberal Party politician.

Johns was the son of Thomas Evans Johns of Cardiganshire and his wife Elizabeth Tudor Avis. Johns became a civil engineer and practiced until 1854. He was then involved in William Bird & Co. of London, a firm of  iron merchants. He was an active promoter of railways in Wales of which he was chairman or deputy chairman for many years until they were taken over by the London and North Western Railway. He was one of the earliest Volunteer officers as captain commanding the 3rd Montgomery Rifle Volunteers. He was a J. P. for Merioneth and Montgomery, and a Deputy Lieutenant for Merioneth.

Johns stood unsuccessfully for Parliament at Northallerton in 1865 and 1868. At the 1885 general election he was elected as Member of Parliament (MP) for Nuneaton. but was defeated at the 1886 general election and did not stand for Parliament again.

Johns married Emily Theresa Bird, in 1855. His daughter Mabel married Sir Francis Taylor Piggott, jurist and writer. He died in 1891, at the age of 67 and is buried in Brookwood Cemetery in a grave he shares with his wife and son-in-law Francis Taylor Piggott.

References

External links 

1824 births
1891 deaths
Liberal Party (UK) MPs for English constituencies
UK MPs 1885–1886
Burials at Brookwood Cemetery
Deputy Lieutenants of Merionethshire